Michael, also called Saint Michael the Archangel, Saint Michael the Taxiarch in Orthodoxy and Archangel Michael is an archangel in Judaism, Christianity, Islam and the Baha'i faith. The earliest surviving mentions of his name are in 3rd- and 2nd-century BC Jewish works, often but not always apocalyptic, where he is the chief of the angels and archangels and he is the guardian prince of Israel and is responsible for the care of Israel. Christianity adopted nearly all the Jewish traditions concerning him, and he is mentioned explicitly in Revelation 12:7–12, where he does battle with Satan, and in the Epistle of Jude, where the author denounces heretics by contrasting them with Michael.

Second Temple Jewish writings 

The earliest surviving mention of Michael is in a 3rd century BC Jewish apocalypse, the Book of Enoch. 
This lists him as one of seven archangels (the remaining names are Uriel, Raguel, Raphael, Sariel, Gabriel, and Remiel), who, according to a slightly later work, the Book of Tobit, "stand ready and enter before the glory of the Lord". The fact that Michael is introduced in both works without explanation implies that readers already knew him and the other named angels, which in turn implies that they are earlier than the late 3rd century BC (the earliest possible date of the relevant passages in the Book of Enoch), but although their origins remain a matter for speculation there is no evidence that they are older than the Hellenistic period. He is mentioned again in last chapters of the Book of Daniel, a Jewish apocalypse composed in the 2nd century BC although set in the 6th, in which a man clothed in linen (never identified, but probably the archangel Gabriel) tells Daniel that he and "Michael, your prince" are engaged in a battle with the "prince of Persia", after which, at the end-time, "Michael, the great prince who protects your people, will arise". 

Enoch was instrumental in establishing the pre-eminent place of Michael among the angels or archangels, and in later Jewish works he is said to be their chief, mediating the Torah (the law of God) and standing at the right hand of the throne of God. In the traditions of the Qumran community he defends or leads the people of God in the eschatological (i.e., end-time) battle, and in other writings he is responsible for the care of Israel (and he may be the "one like a son of man" mentioned in Daniel 7:13–14) and the commander of the heavenly armies; he is Israel's advocate contesting Satan's claim to the body of Moses; he intercedes between God and humanity and serves as High Priest in the heavenly sanctuary; and he accompanies the souls of the righteous dead to Paradise.

New Testament 

 The seven archangels (or four - the traditions differ but always include Michael) were associated with the branches of the menorah, the sacred seven-branched lampstand in the Temple as the seven spirits before the throne of God, and this is reflected in the Revelation of John 4:5 ("From the throne came flashes of lightning, and rumblings and peals of thunder, and before the throne were burning seven torches of fire, which are the seven spirits of God" - ESV). Michael is mentioned explicitly in Revelation 12:7-12, where he does battle with Satan and casts him out of heaven so that he no longer has access to God as accuser (his formal role in the Old Testament). The fall of Satan at the coming of Jesus marks the separation of the New Testament from Judaism. In Luke 22:31 Jesus tells Peter that Satan has asked God for permission to "sift" the disciples, the goal being to accuse them, but the accusation is opposed by Jesus, who thus takes on the role played by angels, and especially by Michael, in Judaism. 

Michael is mentioned by name for the second time in the Epistle of Jude, a passionate plea for believers in Christ to do battle against heresy. In verses 9-10 the author denounces the heretics by contrasting them with the archangel Michael, who, disputing with Satan over the body of Moses,  "did not presume to pronounce the verdict of 'slander' but said, 'The Lord punish you!'

Quran and other Muslim traditions 
Michael is called Mika'il in Muslim works generally, but in the one instance in which he is mentioned in the Quran he is called Mikal. The single Quranic mention comes in the QS 2:98, when the Jews of Medina challenged Muhammed to tell them the name of the angel from whom he received his revelations; when he told them it was Gabriel, the Jews said that Gabriel was their enemy, and that revelations came from Michael. The hadith (sayings of and about the Prophet collected by his followers) quote Muhammed mentioning both Gabriel and Michael as two angels who showed him Paradise and hell, and in the early years of Islam the Muslims recited the names of both in the obligatory daily prayers (the salat). The place of Michael, and some of the other archangels, is not clearly identified in the major sources, and among ordinary Muslims knowledge of them is drawn from non-Islamic sources, notably Jewish.

Later traditions

Judaism

According to rabbinic tradition, Michael acted as the advocate of Israel, and sometimes had to fight with the princes of the other nations (Daniel 10:13) and particularly with the angel Samael, Israel's accuser. Their enmity dates from the time Samael was thrown from heaven and tried to drag Michael down with him, necessitating God's intervention.

The idea that Michael was the advocate of the Jews became so prevalent that in spite of the rabbinical prohibition against appealing to angels as intermediaries between God and his people, he held a place in the Jewish liturgy: "When a man is in need he must pray directly to God, and neither to Michael nor to Gabriel." Jeremiah addresses a prayer to him.

The rabbis declare that Michael entered into his role of defender at the time of the biblical patriarchs. Rabbi Eliezer ben Jacob said he rescued Abraham from the furnace into which he had been thrown by Nimrod (Midrash Genesis Rabbah xliv. 16). Some say he was the "one that had escaped" (Genesis 14:13), who told Abraham that Lot had been taken captive (Midrash Pirke R. El.), and who protected Sarah from defilement by Abimelech.

Michael prevented Isaac from sacrifice by his father by substituting a ram in his place. He saved Jacob, while yet in his mother's womb, from death by Samael. He later prevented Laban from harming Jacob.(Pirke De-Rabbi Eliezer, xxxvi).

The midrash Exodus Rabbah holds that Michael exercised his function of advocate of Israel at the time of the Exodus and destroyed Sennacherib's army.

Christianity

Early Christian views and devotions

Michael was venerated as a healer in Phrygia (modern-day Turkey).

The earliest and most famous sanctuary to Michael in the ancient Near East was also associated with healing waters. It was the Michaelion built in the early 4th century by Constantine the Great at Chalcedon, on the site of an earlier temple called Sosthenion.

Epiphanius of Salamis (c. 310–320 – 403) referred in his Coptic-Arabic Hexaemeron to Michael as a replacement of Satan. Accordingly, after Satan fell, Michael was appointed to the function Satan served when he was still one of the noble angels.

A painting of the Archangel slaying a serpent became a major art piece at the Michaelion after Constantine defeated Licinius near there in 324. This contributed to the standard iconography that developed of Archangel Michael as a warrior saint slaying a dragon. The Michaelion was a magnificent church and in time became a model for hundreds of other churches in Eastern Christianity; these spread devotions to the Archangel.

In the 4th century, Saint Basil the Great's homily (De Angelis) placed Saint Michael over all the angels. He was called "Archangel" because he heralds other angels, the title Ἀρχανγέλος (archangelos) being used of him in Jude 1:9. Into the 6th century, the view of Michael as a healer continued in Rome; after a plague, the sick slept at night in the church of Castel Sant'Angelo (dedicated to him for saving Rome), waiting for his manifestation.

In the 6th century, the growth of devotions to Michael in the Western Church was expressed by the feasts dedicated to him, as recorded in the Leonine Sacramentary. The 7th-century Gelasian Sacramentary included the feast "S. Michaelis Archangeli", as did the 8th-century Gregorian Sacramentary. Some of these documents refer to a Basilica Archangeli (no longer extant) on via Salaria in Rome.

The angelology of Pseudo-Dionysius, which was widely read as of the 6th century, gave Michael a rank in the celestial hierarchy. Later, in the 13th century, others such as Bonaventure believed that he is the prince of the Seraphim, the first of the nine angelic orders. According to Thomas Aquinas (Summa Ia. 113.3), he is the Prince of the last and lowest choir, the Angels.

Catholicism

Catholics often refer to Michael as "Holy Michael, the Archangel" or "Saint Michael", a title that does not indicate canonisation. He is generally referred to in Christian litanies as "Saint Michael", as in the Litany of the Saints. In the shortened version used in the Easter Vigil, he alone of the angels and archangels is mentioned by name, omitting saints Gabriel and Raphael.

In Roman Catholic teachings, Saint Michael has four main roles or offices. His first role is the leader of the Army of God and the leader of heaven's forces in their triumph over the powers of hell. He is viewed as the angelic model for the virtues of the "spiritual warrior", his conflict with evil taken as "the battle within".

The second and third roles of Michael in Catholic teachings deal with death. In his second role, he is the angel of death, carrying the souls of Christians to heaven. In this role he descends at the hour of death, and gives each soul the chance to redeem itself before passing; thus consternating the devil and his minions. Catholic prayers often refer to this role of Michael. In his third role, he weighs souls on his perfectly balanced scales. For this reason, he is often depicted holding scales.

In his fourth role, Saint Michael, the special patron of the Chosen People in the Old Testament, is also the guardian of the church. Saint Michael was revered by the military orders of knights during the Middle Ages. The names of villages around the Bay of Biscay express that history. This role also was why he was considered the patron saint of a number of cities and countries.

Roman Catholicism includes traditions such as the Prayer to Saint Michael, which specifically asks for the faithful to be "defended" by the saint. The Chaplet of Saint Michael consists of nine salutations, one for each choir of angels.

Saint Michael the Archangel prayer

Eastern and Oriental Orthodoxy
The Eastern Orthodox accord Michael the title Archistrategos, or "Supreme Commander of the Heavenly Hosts". The Eastern Orthodox pray to their guardian angels and above all to Michael and Gabriel.

The Eastern Orthodox have always had strong devotions to angels. In contemporary times they are referred to by the term of "Bodiless Powers". A number of feasts dedicated to Archangel Michael are celebrated by the Eastern Orthodox throughout the year.

Archangel Michael is mentioned in a number of Eastern Orthodox hymns and prayer, and his icons are widely used within Eastern Orthodox churches. In many Eastern Orthodox icons, Christ is accompanied by a number of angels, Michael being a predominant figure among them.

In Russia, many monasteries, cathedrals, court and merchant churches are dedicated to the Chief Commander Michael; most Russian cities have a church or chapel dedicated to the Archangel Michael.

While in the Serbian Orthodox Church Saint Sava has a special role as the establisher of its autocephaly and the largest Belgrade church is devoted to him, the capital Belgrade's Orthodox cathedral, the see church of the patriarch, is devoted to Archangel Michael (in Serbian: Арханђел Михаило / Arhanđel Mihailo).

The place of Michael in the Coptic Orthodox Church of Alexandria is as a saintly intercessor. He is the one who presents to God the prayers of the just, who accompanies the souls of the dead to heaven, who defeats the devil. He is celebrated liturgically on the 12th of each Coptic month. In Alexandria, a church was dedicated to him in the early fourth century on the 12th of the month of Paoni. The 12th of the month of Hathor is the celebration of Michael's appointment in heaven, where Michael became the chief of the angels.

Protestant views

Protestant denominations recognize Michael as an archangel. Within Protestantism, the Anglican and Methodist tradition recognizes four angels as archangels: Michael, Raphael, Gabriel, and Uriel. Within Anglicanism, the controversial bishop Robert Clayton (died 1758) proposed that Michael was the Logos and Gabriel the Holy Spirit. Controversy over Clayton's views led the government to order his prosecution, but he died before his scheduled examination.

The Lutheran Churches of St. Michael's Church, Hamburg and St. Michael's Church, Hildesheim are named for him. In Bach's time, the annual feast of Michael and All the Angels on 29 September was regularly celebrated with a festive service in Lutheran churches, for which Bach composed several cantatas, for example the chorale cantata Herr Gott, dich loben alle wir, BWV 130 in 1724, Es erhub sich ein Streit, BWV 19, in 1726 and Man singet mit Freuden vom Sieg, BWV 149, in 1728 or 1729.

Many Protestant Reformers identified Michael with Christ in their writings including the following:   

 Martin Luther  Hengstenberg, 
 Andrew Willet Herman Witsius
 Dr. W. L. Alexander [in Kitto], Prof. Douglas [in Fairbairn]
 Jacobus Ode, Campegius Vitringa, 
 Philip Melanchthon, Hugh Broughton, Franciscus Junius, Hävernick
 Amandus Polanus, Johannes Oecolampadius 
 Bishop Samuel Horsely, William Kincaid John (Jean) Calvin
 Isaac Watts, John Brown's Dictionary, James Wood's Spiritual Dictionary

In the 19th century, Charles Haddon Spurgeon stated that Jesus is "the true Michael" and "the only Archangel".

Seventh-day Adventists

Seventh-day Adventists believe that "Michael" is but one of the many titles applied to the pre-existent Christ, or Son of God. According to Adventists, such a view does not in any way conflict with the belief in his full deity and eternal preexistence, nor does it in the least disparage his person and work. According to Adventist theology, Michael was considered the "eternal Word", and the one by whom all things were created. The Word was then born incarnate as Jesus.

They believe that name "Michael" signifies "One Who Is Like God" and that as the "Archangel" or "chief or head of the angels" he led the angels and thus the statement in Revelation 12:7–9 identifies Jesus as Michael.

Jehovah's Witnesses

Jehovah's Witnesses believe Michael to be another name for Jesus in heaven, in his pre-human and post-resurrection existence. They say the definite article at Jude 9—referring to "Michael the archangel"—identifies Michael as the only archangel. They consider Michael to be synonymous with Christ, described at 1 Thessalonians 4:16 as descending "with a cry of command, with the voice of an archangel, and with the sound of the trumpet".

They believe the prominent roles assigned to Michael at Daniel 12:1, Revelation 12:7, Revelation 19:14, and Revelation 16 are identical to Jesus' roles, being the one chosen to lead God's people and as the only one who "stands up", identifying the two as the same spirit being. Because they identify Michael with Jesus, he is therefore considered the first and greatest of all God's heavenly sons, God's chief messenger, who takes the lead in vindicating God's sovereignty, sanctifying his name, fighting the wicked forces of Satan and protecting God's covenant people on earth. Jehovah's Witnesses also identify Michael with the "Angel of the Lord" who led and protected the Israelites in the wilderness.  Their earliest teachings stated that Archangel Michael was not to be worshipped and was distinct from Jesus.

The Church of Jesus Christ of Latter-day Saints

Members of the Church of Jesus Christ of Latter-day Saints believe that Michael is Adam, the Ancient of Days (Dan. 7), a prince, and the patriarch of the human family. They also hold that Michael assisted Jehovah (the pre-mortal form of Jesus) in the creation of the world under the direction of God the Father (Elohim); under the direction of the Father, Michael also cast Satan out of heaven.

Islam

In Islam, Michael, or Mīkāʾīl, is the angel said to effectuate God's providence as well as natural phenomena, such as rain. He is one of the four archangels along with Jebreel (Gabriel, whom he is often paired with), ʾIsrāfīl (trumpeter angel) and ʿAzrāʾīl (angel of death). 

Michael in Islam is tasked with providing nourishment for bodies and souls and is also responsible for universal or environmental events, and is often depicted as the archangel of mercy. He is said to be friendly, asking God for mercy toward humans and is, according to Muslim legends, one of the first to obey God's orders to bow before Adam. He is also responsible for the rewards doled out to good persons in this life. From the tears of Michael, angels are created as his helpers.

Consensus of Islamic scholars and clerics has enclosed various hadiths as interpretation material for the verse of Ali Imran, Ayah 124| that Gabriel, Michael, Raphael  and thousands of best angels from third level of sky, all came to the battle of Badr. Various hadith traditions linked to the Ali Imran, verse 125|, has stated that those angels has taken form of Zubayr ibn al-Awwam, companion of Muhammad.

In a version of a hadith by an-Nasāʾi, Muhammad is quoted as saying that Gabriel and Michael came to him, and when Gabriel had sat down at his right and Michael at his left, Gabriel told him to recite the Qurʾān in one mode, and Michael told him to ask more, till he reached seven modes, each mode being sufficiently health-giving. According to another hadith in Sahih Muslim, Michael, along with Gabriel both dressed in white, were reported to have accompanied Muhammad on the day of the Battle of Uhud. Safiur Rahman Mubarakpuri has recorded in his historiography works of Quran and Hadith revelation in Prophetic biography, that Sa'd ibn Abi Waqqas testified has saw Jibril and Mikail during that battle.

In Shia Islam, in Dua Umm Dawood, a supplication reportedly handed down by the 6th Imam Ja'far al-Sadiq, the reciter sends blessing upon Michael (with his name spelled as Mīkā'īl):

O Allah! Bestow your blessing on Michael-angel of Your mercy and created for kindness and seeker of pardon for and supporter of the obedient people.

In the creation narrative of Adam he was sent to bring a handful of earth, but the Earth did not yield a piece of itself, some of which will burn. This is articulated by Al-Tha'labi, whose narrative states that God tells Earth that some will obey him and others will not.

Baha'i Faith
The archangel Michael seems to have never been mentioned publicly by Baha'u'llah, 'Abdu'l-Baha, Shoghi Effendi, or even the Universal House of Justice. Baha'i publications interpreting the Book of Revelation from the New Testament say Baha'u'llah was a chief prince of Persia foretold as Michael who would win "final victory over the dragon". Or, Michael, "One like God", is thought to be Baha'u'llah, as archangel Michael is thought to be an emanation of Hod or "glory" in Jewish Mysticism - because "Baha'u'llah" means splendor or glory of God.

Gnosticism
In the Secret Book of John, a 2nd-century text found in the Nag Hammadi codices of Gnosticism, Michael is placed in control of the demons who help Yaldabaoth create Adam, along with six others named Uriel, Asmenedas, Saphasatoel, Aarmouriam, Richram, and Amiorps. According to Origen of Alexandria in his work Against Celsus, Michael was represented as a lion on the Ophite Diagram.

Feasts

In the General Roman Calendar, the Anglican Calendar of Saints, and the Lutheran Calendar of Saints, the archangel's feast is celebrated on Michaelmas Day, 29 September. The day is also considered the feast of Saints Michael, Gabriel, and Raphael, in the General Roman Calendar and the Feast of Saint Michael and All Angels according to the Church of England.

In the Eastern Orthodox Church, Saint Michael's principal feast day is 8 November (those that use the Julian calendar celebrate it on what in the Gregorian calendar is now 21 November), honouring him along with the rest of the "Bodiless Powers of Heaven" (i.e. angels) as their Supreme Commander (Synaxis of the Archangel Michael and the Other Bodiless Powers), and the Miracle at Chonae is commemorated on 6 September.

In the calendar of the Church of England diocese of Truro, 8 May is the feast of St. Michael, Protector of Cornwall. The archangel Michael is one of the three patron saints of Cornwall. The feast of the Appearing of S. Michael the Archangel is observed by Anglo-Catholics on 8 May. From medieval times until 1960 it was also observed on that day in the Roman Catholic Church; the feast commemorates the archangel's apparition on Mount Gargano in Italy.

In the Coptic Orthodox Church, the main feast day in 12 Hathor and 12 Paoni, and he is celebrated liturgically on the 12th of each Coptic month.

Feast of Saint Michael and All Angels is commemorated on 29 September in ROCOR Western Rite.

Apparition of Saint Michael in 492 on Mount Gargano is commemorated on 8 May and Dedication of Saint Michael the Archangel is commemorated on 29 September (Antiochian Western Rite Vicariate).

Dedication of Saint Michael sanctuary Mont-Saint-Michel by Saint Aubert of Avranches is commemorated on 16 October.

On 7 April Oriental Orthodox Church commemorates deliverance prophet Jeremiah from prison by Michael.

Patronages and orders

In late medieval Christianity, Michael, together with Saint George, became the patron saint of chivalry and is now also considered the patron saint of police officers, paramedics and the military.

Since the victorious Battle of Lechfeld against the Hungarians in 955, Michael was the patron saint of the Holy Roman Empire and still is the patron saint of modern Germany and other German-speaking regions formerly covered by the realm.

In mid to late 15th century, France was one of only four courts in Western Christendom without an order of knighthood. Later in the 15th century, Jean Molinet glorified the primordial feat of arms of the archangel as "the first deed of knighthood and chivalrous prowess that was ever achieved." Thus Michael was the natural patron of the first chivalric order of France, the Order of Saint Michael of 1469. In the British honours system, a chivalric order founded in 1818 is also named for these two saints, the Order of St Michael and St George (see also: Order of Saint Michael).

Prior to 1878, the Scapular of St. Michael the Archangel could be worn as part of a Roman Catholic Archconfraternity. Presently, enrollment is authorized as this holy scapular remains as one of the 18 approved by the Church.

Apart from his being a patron of warriors, the sick and the suffering also consider Archangel Michael their patron saint. Based on the legend of his 8th-century apparition at Mont-Saint-Michel, France, the Archangel is the patron of mariners in this famous sanctuary. After the evangelisation of Germany, where mountains were often dedicated to pagan gods, Christians placed many mountains under the patronage of the Archangel, and numerous mountain chapels of St. Michael appeared all over Germany.

Similarly, the Sanctuary of St. Michel (San Migel Aralarkoa), the oldest Christian building in Navarre (Spain), lies at the top of a hill on the Aralar Range, and harbours Carolingian remains. St. Michel is an ancient devotion of Navarre and eastern Gipuzkoa, revered by the Basques, shrouded in legend, and held as a champion against paganism and heresy. It came to symbolize the defense of Catholicism, as well as Basque tradition and values during the early 20th century.He has been the patron saint of Brussels since the Middle Ages. The city of Arkhangelsk in Russia is named for the Archangel. Ukraine and its capital Kyiv also consider Michael their patron saint and protector. 
In Linlithgow, Scotland, St. Michael has been the patron saint of the town since the 13th century, with St. Michael's Parish Church being originally constructed in 1134. 
Since the 14th century, Saint Michael has been the patron saint of Dumfries in Scotland, where a church dedicated to him was built at the southern end of the town, on a mound overlooking the River Nith.

An Anglican sisterhood dedicated to Saint Michael under the title of the Community of St Michael and All Angels was founded in 1851. The Congregation of Saint Michael the Archangel (CSMA), also known as the Michaelite Fathers, is a religious order of the Roman Catholic Church founded in 1897. The Canons Regular of the Order of St Michael the Archangel (OSM) are an Order of professed religious within the Anglican Church in North America, the North American component of the Anglican realignment movement.

The city of Arkhangelsk, Russia, and the federal subject Arkhangelsk Oblast are named after Michael, the Archangel

In the United States military Saint Michael is considered to be a patron of paratroopers and, in particular, the 82nd Airborne Division. One of the first battles where the unit first was combat christened is the Battle of Saint-Mihiel during World War I.

The beret insignia of The 2nd Foreign Legion Parachute Regiment (French: 2 e Régiment étranger de parachutistes, 2 e REP) is a winged arm grasping a dagger, representing Saint Michael.
Saint Michael is the patronus of italian special forces 9° Reggimento "Col Moschin" and the italian state police.

Legends

Judaism
There is a legend which seems to be of Jewish origin, and which was adopted by the Copts, to the effect that Michael was first sent by God to bring Nebuchadnezzar (c. 600 BC) against Jerusalem, and that Michael was afterward very active in freeing his nation from Babylonian captivity.
According to midrash Genesis Rabbah, Michael saved Hananiah and his companions from the Fiery furnace. Michael was active in the time of Esther: "The more Haman accused Israel on earth, the more Michael defended Israel in heaven". It was Michael who reminded Ahasuerus that he was Mordecai's debtor; and there is a legend that Michael appeared to the high priest Hyrcanus, promising him assistance.

According to Legends of the Jews, archangel Michael was the chief of a band of angels who questioned God's decision to create man on Earth; a deeper analysis about Archangel Michael's action here is that Archangel Michael could have also questioned God as to why he did not kill Satan and his rebel horde of demons the minute Adam and Eve were created, thus removing the parable of evil and the question of the Garden of Eden. Regardless, the entire band of angels, except for Michael, was then consumed by fire.

Christianity
The Eastern Orthodox Church celebrates the Miracle at Chonae on September 6. The pious legend surrounding the event states that John the Apostle, when preaching nearby, foretold the appearance of Michael at Cheretopa near Lake Salda, where a healing spring appeared soon after the Apostle left; in gratitude for the healing of his daughter, one pilgrim built a church on the site. Local pagans, who are described as jealous of the healing power of the spring and the church, attempt to drown the church by redirecting the river, but the Archangel, "in the likeness of a column of fire", split the bedrock to open up a new bed for the stream, directing the flow away from the church. The legend is supposed to have predated the actual events, but the 5th – 7th-century texts that refer to the miracle at Chonae formed the basis of specific paradigms for "properly approaching" angelic intermediaries for more effective prayers within the Christian culture.

 in Cornwall, UK that the Archangel appeared to fishermen on St Michael's Mount. According to author Richard Freeman Johnson, this legend is likely a nationalistic twist to a myth. Cornish legends also hold that the mount itself was constructed by giants and that King Arthur battled a giant there.

The legend of the apparition of the Archangel at around 490 AD at a secluded hilltop cave on Monte Gargano in Italy gained a following among the Lombards in the immediate period thereafter, and by the 8th century, pilgrims arrived from as far away as England. The Tridentine Calendar included a feast of the apparition on 8 May, the date of the 663 victory over the Greek Neapolitans that the Lombards of Manfredonia attributed to Saint Michael. The feast remained in the Roman liturgical calendar until removed in the revision of Pope John XXIII. The Sanctuary of Monte Sant'Angelo at Gargano is a major Catholic pilgrimage site.

According to Roman legends, Archangel Michael appeared with a sword over the mausoleum of Hadrian while a devastating plague persisted in Rome, in apparent answer to the prayers of Pope Gregory I the Great (c. 590–604) that the plague should cease. After the plague ended, in honor of the occasion, the pope called the mausoleum "Castel Sant'Angelo" (Castle of the Holy Angel), the name by which it is still known.

According to Norman legend, Michael is said to have appeared to St Aubert, Bishop of Avranches, in 708, giving instruction to build a church on the rocky islet now known as Mont Saint-Michel. In 960 the Duke of Normandy commissioned a Benedictine abbey on the mount, and it remains a major pilgrimage site.

A Portuguese Carmelite nun, Antónia d'Astónaco, reported an apparition and private revelation of the Archangel Michael who had told to this devoted Servant of God, in 1751, that he would like to be honored, and God glorified, by the praying of nine special invocations. These nine invocations correspond to invocations to the nine choirs of angels and origins the famous Chaplet of Saint Michael. This private revelation and prayers were approved by Pope Pius IX in 1851.

From 1961 to 1965, four young schoolgirls had reported several apparitions of Archangel Michael in the small village of Garabandal, Spain. At Garabandal, the apparitions of the Archangel Michael were mainly reported as announcing the arrivals of the Virgin Mary. The Catholic Church has neither approved nor condemned the Garabandal apparitions.

Art and literature

In literature
In the 1667 English epic poem Paradise Lost by John Milton, Michael commands the army of angels loyal to God against the rebel forces of Satan. Armed with a sword from God's armory, he bests Satan in personal combat, wounding his side.

In Henry Wadsworth Longfellow's translation of the mid-13th century The Golden Legend, Michael is one of the angels of the seven planets. He is the angel of Mercury.

In Japanese light novel series Date a Live, Michael is the name of a spiritual weapon (referred to as Angels within the series), belonging to Mukuro Hoshimiya. Michael is a sword-sized key capable of locking away abilities or properties of objects (Michael Segva), as well as opening portals (Michael Lataib) and molecular deconstruction.

Music
Marc-Antoine Charpentier, Praelium Michaelis Archangeli factum in coelo cum dracone, H.410, oratorio for soloists, double chorus, strings and continuo. (1683)

«Archangel Michael» — a song performed by Nikolai Karachentsov.

Film
The 1996 film Michael portrays the archangel as being sent to Earth to perform various tasks.

Peter Mensah portrays Michael in the 2023 movie The Devil Conspiracy.

Artistic depictions

In Christian art, Archangel Michael may be depicted alone or with other angels such as Gabriel. Some depictions with Gabriel date back to the 8th century, e.g. the stone casket at Notre Dame de Mortain church in France.

The widely reproduced image of Our Mother of Perpetual Help, an icon of the Cretan school, depicts Michael on the left carrying the lance and sponge of the crucifixion of Jesus, with Gabriel on the right side of Mary and Jesus.

In many depictions, Michael is represented as an angelic warrior, fully armed with helmet, sword, and shield. The shield may bear the Latin inscription Quis ut Deus or the Greek inscription Christos Dikaios Krites or its initials. He may be standing over a serpent, a dragon, or the defeated figure of Satan, whom he sometimes pierces with a lance. The iconography of Michael slaying a serpent goes back to the early 4th century, when Emperor Constantine defeated Licinius at the Battle of Adrianople in 324 AD, not far from the Michaelion, a church dedicated to Archangel Michael.

Constantine felt that Licinius was an agent of Satan and associated him with the serpent described in the Book of Revelation (12:9). After the victory, Constantine commissioned a depiction of himself and his sons slaying Licinius represented as a serpent – a symbolism borrowed from the Christian teachings on the Archangel to whom he attributed the victory. A similar painting, this time with the Archangel Michael himself slaying a serpent, then became a major art piece at the Michaelion and eventually lead to the standard iconography of Archangel Michael as a warrior saint.

In less common depiction, Michael holds a pair of scales, weighs the souls of the departed and holds the book of life (as in the Book of Revelation) to show he partakes in the judgment. Michelangelo depicted this scene on the altar wall of the Sistine Chapel.

In Byzantine art, Michael was often shown as a princely court dignitary rather than a warrior who battled Satan or with scales for weighing souls on the Day of Judgement.

Churches named after Michael
 St. Michael's Church (disambiguation)

 Parroquia de San Miguel Arcángel (es), San Miguel de Allende, Guanajuato Mexico World Heritage Site
 Parroquia de San Miguel Arcángel Cocula Jalisco Mexico
 Parroquia de San Miguel Arcángel, Utuado, Puerto Rico
 Sacra di San Michele (Saint Michael's Abbey), near Turin, Italy
 Pfarrei Brixen St. Michael with the White Tower, Brixen, Italy
 Cathedral of St. Michael and St. Gudula, in Brussels, Belgium
 Mont-Saint-Michel, Normandy, France – a World Heritage Site
 St. Michael's Cathedral Basilica (Toronto), Canada
 St. Michael's Cathedral (Izhevsk), Russia
 St. Michael's Cathedral, Qingdao, China
 Chudov Monastery in the Moscow Kremlin
 Cathedral of the Archangel in the Moscow Kremlin – a World Heritage Site
 Sanctuary of Monte Sant'Angelo, Gargano, Italy – a World Heritage Site
 St Michael's Mount, Cornwall, UK
 St. Michael Catholic Church
 St. Michael, MN
 St. Michael's Basilica, Miramichi, Canada
 Skellig Michael, off the Irish west coast – a World Heritage Site
 St Michael's Cathedral, Coventry, UK
 St. Michael's Golden-Domed Monastery, Kyiv, Ukraine
 Basilica of St Michael the Archangel, Pensacola, Florida, United States
 St. Michael's Church, Vienna in Vienna, Austria
 Tayabas Basilica, Tayabas, Quezon, Philippines
 St. Michael the Archangel Parish Church, Pontevedra, Negros Occidental, Philippines
 Archdiocesan Shrine and Parish of St. Michael the Archangel, Argao, Cebu, Philippines (Argao Church)
 St. Michael's Church, Berlin, Germany
 St. Michael's Cathedral, Iligan City, Philippines
 St. Michael Cathedral, Ilagan, Philippines
 San Miguel Church (Manila), Philippines
 Cathedral of Saint Michael, Kalibo, Aklan, Philippines
 Iglesia Filipina Independiente - Cathedral of St. Michael the Archangel, Bacoor, Cavite, Philippines
 St. Michael the Archangel Parish, Taguig, Philippines
 St. Michael's Jesuit church, Munich, Germany
 St. Michael's Cathedral, Belgrade in Belgrade, Serbia
 Cathedral of St. Michael the Archangel in Gamu, Isabela, Philippines
 Mission San Miguel Arcángel, San Miguel, California, United States, one of the California Missions
 St Michael at the North Gate, Oxford, UK
 St. Michael's Church, Mumbai, India
 Church of St. Michael, Štip, Republic of Macedonia
 St Michael and All Angels Church, Polwatte
 St Michael's Church, Churchill, UK
 St Michael's Catholic Church, Halifax, Canada
 St Michael the Archangel, Llanyblodwel, England
 St Michael's Parish Church, Linlithgow, West Lothian, Scotland

See also

 Abatur
 Angelus
 Arkhangelsk
 Biblical cosmology
 Christian angelic hierarchy
 Guardian Angel of Portugal
 Hierarchy of angels
 List of angels in theology
 Metatron
 Saint Michael, patron saint archive
 Psychopomp
 Quis ut Deus?
 Saint Michael in the Catholic Church
 Saureil
 Seraph
 Theophory in the Bible
 Uriel

References

Notes

Citations

Sources

Further reading

External links

 Michael in The Jewish Encyclopedia

 
Adam and Eve in Mormonism
Angels in the Book of Enoch
Angels of death
Archangels
Archangels in Christianity
Archangels in Islam
Archangel in Judaism
Michael
Christian saints from the Old Testament
Eastern Orthodox saints
Individual angels
Patron saints of France
Quranic figures